Fonoprint is a famous recording studio  located in Bologna,  Italy, founded in 1976. Owner Leopoldo Cavalli, CEO Giacomo Golfieri, sound engineers Maurizio Biancani and others. The facility is Dolby Atmos Music certified.

Albums recorded and/or mixed at the studio

Vasco Rossi
 ...Ma cosa vuoi che sia una canzone... (1978)
 Non siamo mica gli americani (1979)
 Siamo solo noi (1981)
 Vado Al Massimo (1982)
 Bollicine (1983)
 Fronte del palco (1990)
 Vasco London Instant Live 04.05.2010 (2010)
Claudio Lolli
 Extranei (1980)
 Ho visto anche degli zingari felici (2003)
Change
 Miracles (1981)
Pooh
 Non siamo in pericolo/Anni senza fiato (1982)
 Tropico del Nord (1983)
Luca Carboni
 ...intanto Dustin Hoffman non sbaglia un film (1984)
 Forever (1985)
 Luca Carboni (1987)
 Luca Carboni (1989)
 L'avvenire (1990)
 LU*CA (2001)
 Live (2003)
 Senza Titolo (2011)
Marcella Bella
 Nell'Aria (1983)
Miguel Bosé
 Salamandra (1986)
Zucchero
 Blue's (1987)
 All the Best (2007)
 Live in Italy (2008)
Eros Ramazzotti
 In certi momenti (1987)
 Musica è (1988)
 In ogni senso (1990)
 Tutte Storie (1993)
 Dove c'è musica (1996)
 Eros (Eros Ramazzotti album) (1997)
 9 (2003)
Lucio Dalla
 1983 (1983)
 Viaggi Organizzati (1984)
 DallAmeriCaruso (1986)
 Henna (1993)
Lucio Dalla/Gianni Morandi
 Dalla/Morandi (1988)
Milva
 Uomini addosso (1993)
Sangue Misto
 SXM (1994)
Franco Battiato
 Giubbe Rosse (1989, live)
 Messa Arcaica (1993)
 L'Ombrello E La Macchina Da Cucire (1995)
Francesco Guccini
 1996 – D'amore di morte e di altre sciocchezze
 1998 – Guccini Live Collection (live)
 2000 – Stagioni
 2004 – Ritratti
 2005 – Anfiteatro Live (live)
 2006 – The Platinum Collection
 2010 – Storia di altre storie
 2012 – L'ultima Thule
Giorgia
 Come Thelma & Louise (1995)
 Strano il mio destino (Live & studio 95/96) (1996)
Claudio Baglioni
 Viaggiatore sulla coda del tempo (1999)
Skiantos
 Doppia dose (1999)
Mango
 Dove vai (1995)
 Visto così (1999)
Laura Pausini
 Tra te e il mare (2000)
 La solitudine and others from The Best of Laura Pausini: E ritorno da te (2001)
 Io canto (2006)
 Primavera in anticipo (2008)
Carmen Consoli
 Stato di necessità (2000)
Sting
 ...All This Time (2001)
Angelo Branduardi
 Futuro antico III (2002)
 Futuro antico IV (2007)
Luciano Ligabue
 Fuori come va? (2002)
 Giro d'Italia (2003)
 Il mio pensiero and Ho ancora la forza (2008)
Alice
 Viaggio in Italia (2003)
Ivano Fossati
 Lampo viaggiatore (2003)
Federico Poggipollini
 Bologna e Piove (2003)
Francesco Renga
 Orchestraevoce (2008)
Noemi
 Vuoto a perdere (2011)
Il Volo
 L'amore Si Muove (2015)
Matia Bazar
 Melanchólia (1985)
Peter Jacques Band
 Fire Night Dance (1979)
 Welcome Back (1980)
Lùnapop
 ...Squérez? (1999)

See also
Mauro Malavasi
Roberto Costa

External links
 

Recording studios in Italy